Contactless may refer to:

 Contactless smart card
 Proximity card, a contactless integrated circuit device used for security access or payment systems
 Contactless payment, systems which use RFID for making secure payments
 MasterCard Contactless, MasterCard's EMV-compatible contactless payment feature 
 Radio-frequency identification, an automatic identification method
 Near Field Communication, a short-range wireless technology
 Contactless fingerprinting is a step beyond wet-ink, but not necessarily "touchless" and refers to processes for data collection, verification and identification